John Walter may refer to:

 John Walter (artist/actor) (born 1961), American artist
 John Walter (judge) (1566–1630), English judge and member of parliament
 Sir John Walter, 3rd Baronet (c. 1674–1722), British politician
 John Rolle Walter (1714–1779), Tory MP for Exeter in 1754–1776 and for Devon in 1776–1779
 John Walter (publisher) (1738–1812), founder of The Times newspaper, London
 John Walter (editor, born 1776) (1776–1847), his son, second editor of The Times
 John Walter (editor, born 1818) (1818–1894), his son, editor of The Times
 John Walter (businessman) (1849–1920), Canadian entrepreneur
 John Walter (Indian Army officer) (1861–1951), British officer who served in the Indian Army
 John Walter (politician) (1863–1944), Australian politician
 Jack Walter (rugby union) (John Walter, 1904–1966), New Zealand rugby player
 John H. Walter (1927–2021), American mathematician
 John Whitney Walter (1934–2018), American business executive, cousin of American president Donald Trump
 John F. Walter (born 1944), U.S. federal judge
 John Walter (filmmaker) (born 1966), director of How to Draw a Bunny and Theater of War
 John C. Walter, American historian and professor at University of Washington
 John Walter (artist) (born 1978), British artist

See also
 John Walters (disambiguation)
 John Waters (disambiguation)